The Journal of Creating Value is a peer reviewed academic journal that focusses on creating value for customers and in turn creating value for the company and its stakeholders. Gautam Mahajan, CEO Customer Value Foundation is the founding editor of the Journal.

The Journal provides a platform for information and debate on the new concepts of Customer-led management practices.

External links 
 
 Homepage
 Customer Value Foundation

References 

 Customer Value Foundation

SAGE Publishing academic journals
Publications established in 2015
Business and management journals